Jesse Levi Fatherree Jr. (June 7, 1913 – July 23, 1962) was an American football, basketball, and baseball player and coach.

Head coaching career
Fatherree was the fourth head football coach at Southeastern Louisiana College—now known as Southeastern Louisiana University—and held that position for the 1941 season. His coaching record at Southeastern Louisiana was 4–5. 

He was also the head basketball coach at Louisiana State University (LSU) for the first 18 games of the 1944–45 season, tallying a mark of 11–7.

Assistant coaching career
Fatherree was the backfield coach for the LSU Tigers football team from 1942 and 1948 and was hired at Mississippi State College—now known as Mississippi State University—in the same role in 1949.

Playing career
Fatherree lettered in football, basketball, and baseball at LSU in the 1930s.

Personal life
Fatherree moved to Fort Worth, Texas in 1952 and worked as sales manager for a firm that sold aircraft parts. He died at a hospital there on July 23, 1962.  Fatherree was inducted into the Mississippi Sports Hall of Fame in 1964.

Head coaching record

Football

Basketball

References

1913 births
1962 deaths
American football halfbacks
American men's basketball players
Baseball players from Jackson, Mississippi
Basketball coaches from Mississippi
Basketball players from Jackson, Mississippi
College men's basketball head coaches in the United States
Deaths from hepatitis
Guards (basketball)
LSU Tigers baseball players
LSU Tigers basketball coaches
LSU Tigers basketball players
LSU Tigers football coaches
LSU Tigers football players
Mississippi State Bulldogs football coaches
Players of American football from Jackson, Mississippi
Southeastern Louisiana Lions football coaches
Sportspeople from Jackson, Mississippi